Singapore competed at the 2000 Summer Olympics in Sydney, Australia.

Results by event

Sailing
Nine men and three women competed in the eight events in the Sailing competition in Sydney.

Men's Double Handed Dinghy (470)
 Tan Wearn Haw and Koh Seng Leong
 Race 1 – 24
 Race 2 – 26
 Race 3 – 22
 Race 4 – 23
 Race 5 – 13
 Race 6 – 21
 Race 7 – (30) DNF
 Race 8 – 25
 Race 9 – 12
 Race 10 – 26
 Race 11 – (28)
 Final – 192 (→ 28th place)

Men's Sailing (Laser) Individual Competition
 Stanley Tan

Shooting
Women's Air Pistol
 Shirley Ng

Swimming
Men's 50 m Freestyle
 Leslie Kwok
 Preliminary Heat – 24.00 (→ did not advance)

Men's 100 m Freestyle
 Mark Chay
 Preliminary Heat – 52.24 (→ did not advance)

Men's 200 m Freestyle
 Mark Chay
 Preliminary Heat – 1:52.22 (→ did not advance)

Men's 400 m Freestyle
 Ju Wei Sng
 Preliminary Heat – 04:01.34 (→ did not advance)

Men's 100 m Breaststroke
 Daniel Liew
 Preliminary Heat – 01:06.41 (→ did not advance)

Men's 100 m Backstroke
 Gary Tan
 Preliminary Heat – 58.69 (→ did not advance)

Men's 200 m Backstroke
 Gary Tan
 Preliminary Heat – 02:06.32 (→ did not advance)

Women's 50 m Freestyle
 Joscelin Yeo
 Preliminary Heat – 26.71 (→ did not advance)

Women's 100 m Freestyle
 Joscelin Yeo
 Preliminary Heat – 57.15 (→ did not advance)

Women's 400 m Freestyle
 Christel Bouvron
 Preliminary Heat – 04:25.16 (→ did not advance)

Women's 100 m Butterfly
 Joscelin Yeo
 Preliminary Heat – 01:01.28 (→ did not advance)

Women's 200 m Butterfly
 Christel Bouvron
 Preliminary Heat – 02:17.62 (→ did not advance)

Women's 100 m Breaststroke
 Joscelin Yeo
 Preliminary Heat – 01:13.25 (→ did not advance)

Women's 200 m Breaststroke
 Nicolette Teo
 Preliminary Heat – 02:37.39 (→ did not advance)

Women's 200 m Individual Medley
 Joscelin Yeo
 Preliminary Heat – 02:19.18 (→ did not advance)

Table tennis
Women's Competition
 Jing Junhong – 4th place
 Li Jiawei

References
Official Olympic Reports
sports-reference

Nations at the 2000 Summer Olympics
2000
2000 in Singaporean sport